Totakacharya (IAST ) 8th century CE) was a disciple of Ādi Śaṅkara, the Advaita Vedanta teacher. He was made the first Jagadguru (head) of the Jyotir Pīthaṃ, the original northern maṭha founded by Ādi Śaṅkara in Uttarakhand. He founded a maṭha by name Vadakke modam in Thrissur, Kerala.

Meeting Ādi Śaṅkara
The  states that when Ādi Śaṅkara was at Śṛṅgeri, he met a boy named Giri. Ādi Śaṅkara accepted the boy as his disciple. Giri was a hard-working and loyal disciple of his Guru, Ādi Śaṅkara, though he did not appear bright to the other disciples. One day, Giri was busy plucking flowers for pooja, when Ādi Śaṅkara sat down to begin a lesson on Advaita Vedānta. He however did not start the lesson saying he was waiting for Giri to come back from his chores and singing lessons. At this, Padmapada pointed to a wall and said that it would be the same if Ādi Śaṅkara taught to this dumb object as he taught to Giri. Now, Ādi Śaṅkara wanted to reward Giri for his loyalty and devotion. Thus he mentally granted Giri the complete knowledge of all the śāstras (sciences). The enlightened Giri composed extempore the Toṭākāṣṭakam, a Sanskrit poem in the toṭaka metre, in praise of the Guru Ādi Śaṅkara. Thus the humble disciple Giri became Toṭākācārya.

Works
Śrutisārasamuddharaņa — Published edition: Edited with a commentary titled Girisambhutaratna, by Swami Vidyananda Giri, Sri Kailash Ashrama, Rishikesh, 1972
Toṭākāṣṭakam

Toṭakāṣṭakam
The Toṭakāṣṭakam was composed by Giri in praise of his Guru Ādiśaṅkara. Literally, it means a rhyme of eight verses (ślokas) composed by Toṭaka. The poem's meter is anapestic tetrameter, with four feet of unstressed-unstressed-stressed syllables (laghu-laghu-guru characters) per line, and four lines per stanza.

Footnotes 

 The delusion here refers to Avidyā. According to Advaitavedānta the whole world is a figment of imagination and perceived as real due to delusion. The poet is asking for removal of this delusion from his preceptor. The poet has no confusion about Śiva being Śaṅkara.

See also
Gnanananda Giri
Adi Shankara
Advaita Vedanta

References
Comans, Michael (aka Vasudevacharya)  (1996) Extracting the Essence of the Sruti: The Srutisarasamuddharnam of Totakacarya – Publ. Motilal Banarsidass, Delhi, India. 
Madhava Vidyaranya, Sankara-Digvijaya, translated by Swami Tapasyananda, Sri Ramakrishna Math, 2002, . Purchase online at www.sriramakrishnamath.org
Totakashatakam online
Advaitin philosophers
People from Chamoli district